Dag Otto Lauritzen (born 12 September 1956) is a Norwegian television personality and retired professional cyclist. At the 1984 Summer Olympics in Los Angeles he won a bronze medal in the individual road race. He was the first Norwegian to win a stage of the Tour de France, which he did on Bastille Day in 1987 at Luz Ardiden. Over his career he rode the Tour de France eight times.

Lauritzen began cycling to recuperate from a military parachuting injury, and switched careers from police officer to cyclist. He won the Norwegian National Road Race Championship in 1984 and the Norwegian National Time Trial Championship in 1990.

He is now a cycling commentator on Norwegian TV station TV 2.

Major results

1983
 1st  Road race, Nordic Road Championships
 1st  Team time trial, National Road Championships
 1st Roserittet DNV GP
1984
 1st  Road race, Nordic Road Championships
 1st  Road race, National Road Championships
 1st Stage 9 Tour of Austria
 3rd  Road race, Summer Olympics
1985
 1st GP de Peymeinade
 2nd Grand Prix d'Antibes
1986
 3rd Tour du Haut Var
 3rd  Road race, Nordic Road Championships
 6th Overall Tour of Sweden
1st Stage 7
1987
 1st Rund um den Henninger-Turm
 1st Stage 14 Tour de France
 1st Overall Redlands Bicycle Classic
1st Stages 1, 2 & 3 (TTT)
 7th La Flèche Wallonne
 7th Züri-Metzgete
1988
 2nd International Cycling Classic
 7th Amstel Gold Race
 9th Rund um den Henninger Turm
1989
 1st Overall Tour de Trump
 3rd Tour of Flanders
 4th Giro dell'Etna
 10th Overall Tour of Ireland
1990
 1st  Time trial, National Road Championships
 1st Stage 4 Tour de Trump
 3rd Trofeo Baracchi (with Sean Yates)
1991
 1st Overall Ringerike GP
 7th Overall Tour of Ireland
1992
 1st Overall Tour of Norway
1st Stages 2, 3 & 4
 1st Overall Ringerike GP
 9th Grand Prix d'Isbergues
1993
 1st Stage 15 Vuelta a España
 1st Stage 3 Kellogg's Tour
 1st Stage 1a Three Days of De Panne
 7th Road race, UCI Road World Championships

General classification results timeline

Major stage race general classification results timeline

Monuments and Classics results timeline

Major championships results timeline

References

External links
 
 Official Tour de France results for Dag Otto Lauritzen
 

1956 births
Living people
Norwegian male cyclists
Norwegian Tour de France stage winners
Norwegian Vuelta a España stage winners
Cyclists at the 1984 Summer Olympics
Olympic cyclists of Norway
Olympic bronze medalists for Norway
People from Grimstad
Olympic medalists in cycling
Medalists at the 1984 Summer Olympics
Sportspeople from Agder